The Heart of Dallas Classic was a planned annual college football game played on the opening weekend of the State Fair of Texas at the historic Cotton Bowl in Fair Park, Dallas, Texas. However, the game was not renewed beyond its initial (and only) contest.

Game results 

Winner listed in bold.

References

External links
 Heart of Dallas

American football in the Dallas–Fort Worth metroplex
State Fair of Texas